Anar may refer to:

Places
 Anar County, Kerman Province, Iran
 Anar, Iran, the capital of Anar County
 Anar, Ardabil, a village in Ardabil Province, Iran
 Anar, Markazi, a village in Markazi Province, Iran

Other uses
 Anar, the name for pomegranate in multiple languages
 Anar Rzayev (born 1938), Azerbaijani writer
 İhsan Oktay Anar (born 1960), Turkish writer and illustrator
 ANAR Research, a Turkish public opinion polling company; see November 2015 Turkish general election
 Anar (album), a 2011 by Czech musician Markéta Irglová
"Anar", a 2014 song by Israeli instrumental-based power-trio TATRAN
"Anar"a type of firework referred  as anar in India